The 1950–51 OB I bajnokság season was the 14th season of the OB I bajnokság, the top level of ice hockey in Hungary. Eight teams participated in the league, and Kinizsi SE Budapest won the championship.

Regular season

External links
 Season on hockeyarchives.info

Hun
OB I bajnoksag seasons
1950–51 in Hungarian ice hockey